Alberto Rodríguez de Lista y Aragón (October 15, 1775October 5, 1848), Spanish poet and educationalist, was born in Seville.

Biography
He began teaching at the age of fifteen, and when little over twenty was made professor of elocution and poetry at the University of Seville. In 1813 he was exiled, on political grounds, but pardoned in 1817. He then returned to Spain and, after teaching for three years at Bilbao, started a critical review at Madrid. Shortly afterwards he founded the celebrated college of San Mateo in that city. The liberal character of the San Mateo educational system was not favored by the government, and in 1823 the college was closed.

Lista after some time spent in Bayonne, Paris and London was recalled to Spain in 1833 to edit the official Madrid Gazette. He was one of the founders of the Ateneo, the free university of Madrid, and up till 1840 was director of a college at Cadiz. All the leading spirits of the young generation of Spaniards, statesmen, writers, soldiers and diplomatists came under his influence. He died at Seville on October 5, 1848.

Notes

References
 Corona poética: dedicada por la Academia de buenos letras de esta ciudad al Sr. D. Alberto Lista y Aragon; precedida de su biografia. Sevilla, 1849.
 Hans Juretschke: Vida, obra y pensamiento de Alberto Lista. Madrid: Escuela de Historia Moderna, 1951.
 Hans Juretschke: Reflexiones en torno al bicentenario de Alberto Lista: conferencia. Madrid: Fundación Univ. Española, 1977.
 María del Carmen García Tejera: Conceptos y teorías literarias españolas del siglo XIX: Alberto Lista. Cádiz: Servicio de Publicaciones, Universidad de Cádiz, 1989.
 José Matías Gil González: Vida y personalidad de Alberto Lista. Sevilla: Ayuntamiento de Sevilla, Servicio de Publ, 1994. .

External links
 

1775 births
1848 deaths
Spanish poets
Afrancesados
Members of the Royal Spanish Academy
University of Seville alumni
Spanish male poets